Lisa Marie Newmyer (born August 27, 1968) is an American actress. She made her feature film debut in Texas Chainsaw Massacre: The Next Generation (1994), and went on to appear in several other films, such as Sin City (2005) and A Scanner Darkly (2006).

Biography
Newmyer graduated from the School of Theatre at the University of the Incarnate Word in San Antonio, Texas. She made her feature film debut in Texas Chainsaw Massacre: The Next Generation (1994) opposite Renée Zellweger and Matthew McConaughey and directed by Kim Henkel, the writer of the 1974 original film.

In 1997, she was cast as Mona on the MTV series Austin Stories, which aired through 1998. In 2005, she had a supporting role in Frank Miller's Sin City (2005), and the following year appeared in a supporting role in Richard Linklater's sci-fi film A Scanner Darkly portraying Connie.

Filmography

References

External links

Texas Chainsaw Massacre: The Next Generation still from the Margaret Herrick Library

1968 births
Actresses from Austin, Texas
University of the Incarnate Word alumni
Living people
21st-century American women